The men's 82.5 kg weightlifting competitions at the 1948 Summer Olympics in London took place on 11 August at the Empress Hall of the Earls Court Exhibition Centre. It was the sixth time the light-heavyweight class competition was held, all at 82.5 kg.

Each weightlifter had three attempts at each of the three lifts. The best score for each lift was summed to give a total. The weightlifter could increase the weight between attempts (minimum of 5 kg between first and second attempts, 2.5 kg between second and third attempts) but could not decrease weight. If two or more weightlifters finished with the same total, the competitors' body weights were used as the tie-breaker (lighter athlete wins).

Records
Prior to this competition, the existing world and Olympic records were as follows.

Results

New records

References

Weightlifting at the 1948 Summer Olympics